Håll om mig nu was released on 18 August 1998 and is a compilation album from Swedish "dansband" Lotta Engbergs.

Track listing
I'm Gonna Rock It
Håll om mig nu
Våra nya vingar
Juliette & Jonathan
Ringen på mitt finger
Någon
Fernando
Emelie
När du tar mig i din famn
Äntligen på väg
Jag önskar det alltid vore sommar
Leva livet ("It's My Party")

1998 compilation albums